Live in Jerusalem 1994 is a live album by John Zorn's Masada recorded at the Jerusalem Festival in 1994.

Reception
The Allmusic review by Heather Phares awarded the album 4½ stars stating "Masada: Live in Jerusalem features versions of "Zebdi," "Jair," "Kanah," and "Netivot" that showcase Masada's intensity".

Track listing 
All compositions by John Zorn
 Disc one
 "Piram" - 9:52
 "Bith Aneth" - 11:57
 "Lachish" - 3:35
 "Peliyot" - 7:11
 "Hadasha" - 10:53
 "Ravayah" - 3:35
 "Zebdi" - 1:53
 "Tirzah" - 8:07
 "Hekhal" - 3:31
 Disc two
 "Kanah" - 6:12
 "Shilhim" - 2:39
 "Ziphim" - 9:09
 "Abidan" - 6:24
 "Netivot" - 4:50
 "Zelah" - 4:54
 "Idalah-Abal" - 5:04
 "Jair" - 5:15
 "Ashnah" - 6:10
Recorded live at the Jerusalem Festival

Personnel 
 John Zorn – saxophone
 Dave Douglas – trumpet
 Greg Cohen – bass
 Joey Baron – drums

References 

Masada (band) albums
John Zorn live albums
1999 live albums
Tzadik Records live albums